Mr. Neighbor's House is a series of TV specials created by Brian Huskey, Jason Mantzoukas, and Jesse Falcon. It is a parody of Mister Rogers' Neighborhood and premiered on December 2, 2016 on Adult Swim. The puppets for the characters were created by Viva la Puppet. The specials are produced by Alive and Kicking, Inc.

A second special, Mr. Neighbor's House 2, premiered on June 24, 2018.

Plot
Mr. Neighbor's House is an educational television show that takes place in Neighbortown and in the mind of a mental patient named Jim who hasn't said a word in 7 years.

Cast

Live actors
 Brian Huskey as Mr. Neighbor/Jim
Mary Holland as Ms. Jen Lady, Nurse Mary (special #1 and 2), Patient (special #2)
 Nick Kroll as Photo Joe (special #1)
 Jon Daly as Demon #1 (special #1)
 Steve Agee as Demon #2 (special #1)
 Marc Evan Jackson as Aubrey Johnson (special #2), Doctor (special #2), Patient #2 (special #2)
 David Theune as Ice Cream Bruce (special #2), Patient #3 (special #2)
 Jerry Minor as Detective (special #2)
 Seth Morris as Jim's Father (special #2)
 Colleen Smith as Jim's Mother (special #2)
 Gil Ozeri as Wolfe (special #2)
 Meg Delancy as Scarlett (special #2)
 Jean Villepique as Cindy (special #2)
 Victoria Grace as Cassidy (special #2)
 Joey McIntyre as Game Show Host (special #2)
 Amari O'Neil as Ricky (special #2)
 Nathan Arenas as Evan (special #2)
 Jenna Davis as Ingrid (special #2)
 Isabella Day as Fiona (special #2)
 Chris Palermo as Mr. Neighbor (stunt double)

Puppeteers
 Jonathan Kidder as Duff and Daisy (special #2)
 Bruce Lanoil - Demon #3 (special #1), Officer Policecop (special #1)
 Adrian Rose Leonard - Buddy
 Colleen Smith - Donna the Mystic (special #1), Floral Handbag (special #1)
 Michelle Zamora - Friendly Ghost (special #1), Grandma Wrinkles (special #1), Creeper (special #2)

Episodes

Premiere
Mr. Neighbor's House premiered on December 2, 2016 at midnight on Adult Swim. On October 21, 2016, Brian Huskey, who plays the role of Mr. Neighbor, posted a trailer for the special on YouTube to anticipate the special's premiere.

References

Notes

External links
 

2016 television films
Adult Swim pilots and specials